Pipestela candelabra is a species of sponge belonging to the family Axinellidae. 

The species was first described in 2008.

References

External links
Pipestela candelabra occurrence data from GBIF

Axinellidae
Sponge genera
Taxa described in 2008
Taxa named by John Hooper (marine biologist)
Taxa named by Rob van Soest